Robert Thoeren (1903–1957) was a German screenwriter and film actor. Thoeren was born in Moravia, then part of the Austro-Hungarian Empire. After the First World War the German-speaking Thoeren emigrated to Germany where he became a theatre and film actor. Thoeren appeared in leading roles in several German-language films made by Paramount at the Joinville Studios in Paris.

Thoeren went into exile following the Nazi rise to power in 1933, first in France and later in the United States. Thoeren had already ceased acting and begun writing screenplays for films and became a top writer in the United States working with leading directors including Joseph Losey and William Dieterle. Thoeren returned to Germany after the Second World War and continued his career as a screenwriter. His story idea for the 1935 French film Fanfare of Love and its 1951 German remake Fanfares of Love was used as the basis for Billy Wilder's Some Like It Hot released in 1959, two years after his death.

He married the German actress Erica Beer in 1957, but died in the same year in a car crash.

Selected filmography

Actor
 Tropical Nights (1931)
 Woman in the Jungle (1931)
 The Squeaker (1931)
 That's All That Matters (1931)

Screenwriter
 Les yeux noirs (1935)
 Fanfare of Love (1935)
 Hotel Imperial (1939)
 Rage in Heaven (1941)
 Summer Storm (1944)
 Mrs. Parkington (1944)
 Singapore (1947)
 An Act of Murder (1948)
 The Fighting O'Flynn (1949)
 My Daughter Joy (1950)
 September Affair (1950)
 Fanfares of Love (1951)
 The Prowler (1951)
 Bandits of the Autobahn (1955)
 Sarajevo (1955)
 Between Time and Eternity (1956)
 Confessions of Felix Krull (1957)
  (1958)
 A Woman Who Knows What She Wants (1958)
 Some Like It Hot (1959)

References

Bibliography
 Gemunden, Gerd. A Foreign Affair: Billy Wilder's American Films. Berghahn Books, 2008.
 Phillips, Gene D. Some Like It Wilder: The Life and Controversial Films of Billy Wilder. University Press of Kentucky, 2010.

External links

1903 births
1957 deaths
Actors from Brno
People from the Margraviate of Moravia
Jewish emigrants from Nazi Germany to France
German male screenwriters
German male film actors
20th-century German male actors
German male writers
Film people from Brno
Moravian-German people
20th-century German screenwriters